The 2009 ADAC GT Masters season was the third season of the ADAC GT Masters, the grand tourer-style sports car racing founded by the German automobile club ADAC. It began on 12 April at Motorsport Arena Oschersleben and finished on 18 October at the same place after seven double-header meetings. Christian Abt with help of Shane Williams, Jan Seyffarth and Christopher Mies clinched the championship title.

Race calendar and results

Standings

References

External links
 
 ADAC GT Masters on RacingSportCars
 2009 ADAC GT Masters season on Speedsport Magazine

ADAC GT Masters season
ADAC GT Masters seasons